Mount Walter is the second highest named summit in the U.S. state of New Mexico, rising to 13,141 feet above sea level. Both peaks lie in the Taos Mountains, a subrange of the Sangre de Cristo Mountains, which is in turn a subrange of the Rocky Mountains. They are also in the Wheeler Peak Wilderness of Carson National Forest.

References 

Mountains of New Mexico
Landforms of Taos County, New Mexico
Mountains of Taos County, New Mexico